Wardoceras is an extinct nautiloid genus from the late Early Ordovician of Western Utah, assigned to the orthocerid family, Michelinoceratidae

Background
Shells of Wardoceras are smooth and orthoconic, with a circular cross section and small subcentral siphuncle, the segments of which are ventrally straight and dorsally slightly expanded into the camerae. The siphuncle is completely encircled internally by a thin lining that thickens and thins rhythmically so as to slightly thicken just forward of the septal necks, suggesting an origin in annular deposits. Cameral deposits are well developed and are thick, almost filling the ventral portion of the more apical chambers but also found in dorsal chambers as well.

Wardoceras is represented by the type species, Wardoceras orygoforme which is known only from the holotype, a 97mm long portion of a phragmocone 13.5mm in diameter at the anterior end; found 25.9 m (85 ft) above the base of the Wahwah Limestone, section J, Ibex area, Utah.

Wardoceras is named for Jane Shaw Ward, author of the Tajar stories. See also Tajaroceras, Rangeroceras, and Veneficoceras

See also

 Nautiloid
 List of nautiloids

References
 Stephen C. Hook and Rousseau H. Flower 1977. Late Canadian (Zones J,K) Cephalopod Faunas from Southwestern United States. Memoir 32, New Mexico Bureau of Mines and Mineral Resources.
 Sepkoski, J.J. Jr. 2002. A compendium of fossil marine animal genera. D.J. Jablonski & M.L. Foote (eds.). Bulletins of American Paleontology 363: 1–560. Sepkoski's Online Genus Database (Cephalopoda)

Nautiloids